Crosby, Columbo, and Vallee is a 1932 Warner Bros. Merrie Melodies cartoon short directed by Rudolf Ising. The short was released on March 19, 1932. It lampoons the popularity of crooners among young women, with popular crooners Bing Crosby, Russ Columbo, and Rudy Vallée being the namesake of the film.

Title song
The title song had earlier been recorded by Dick Robertson in 1931 (Perfect 12772B) and called upon men to fight "these public enemies" brought into homes via radio. It was probably the inspiration for the cartoon.

Plot
A tribe of American Indians is unhappy about the way that the three radio crooners (Bing Crosby, Russ Columbo and Rudy Vallée) have influenced their squaws and the cartoon opens with the braves singing the “Crosby, Columbo and Vallée” song.

Next a young brave is seen canoeing over various dangers to meet his girl. When he reaches her tipi, he produces a radio and with the help of a spider who provides the necessary connection, the radio gives out with some more of the title song and a snatch of a Crosby-like voice singing “Many Happy Returns of the Day”. The animals in the forest join in and a floppy-eared dog sings “This Is My Love Song” in a Vallée impression.

The radio is retuned and the title song emerges again and many young Indians join in a dance as do the forest animals. A fire breaks out and three baby birds are trapped at the top of a tree. The young Indian brave enlists the help of ten bees who pick up a large spider's web and the baby birds jump down into the web and are saved.

Reception
The Film Daily called it "A lively cartoon...Makes a tuneful number, with the usual animated antics." The Motion Picture Herald said: "Amusing, especially for the younger element..."

References

External links

Crosby, Columbo, and Vallee on Dailymotion
Crosby, Columbo, and Vallee on YouTube

1932 films
1932 animated films
1932 comedy films
American black-and-white films
1930s English-language films
Films scored by Frank Marsales
Animated films about music and musicians
Films about Native Americans
Films about radio
Films directed by Rudolf Ising
Merrie Melodies short films
1930s Warner Bros. animated short films